St. James End also known as simply St. James and historically St James's End (or locally 'Jimmy's End') is a district west of the town centre in Northampton, England. The area developed from the mid to late 19th century particularly with the expansion of the shoe manufacturing and engineering industries, and also the extension of the railway from London in June 1882.

History

Northampton Abbey
The area is named after St James' Abbey which was founded in the town 1104–05 by William Peverel as an Augustinian monastery dedicated to St James and which was built in the area of the modern development. The abbey was located in the Abbots Way area, off the south side of Weedon Road in the town (see map). The former Express Lift factory, which included the lift-testing tower, was redeveloped for housing in 1999–2000. The site was known to occupy part of the precinct of the abbey. Excavations were carried out to determine the location and remains of any parts of the abbey. The abbey and a cemetery were located. The main buildings were preserved beneath the new housing development. The cemetery of c.300 burials was excavated during winter 2000–2001. The bones were analysed to determine the health and burial practices in the late medieval population of Northampton.

294 burials were uncovered in well ordered rows, with many wooden coffins, graves lined with old ceramic roof-tiles, stone-lined graves and a single stone coffin suggesting the occupants of relatively high status. Use of the cemetery later was less orderly. Burials were in simple, shallow graves with just a shroud. On the south side was a stone-built building with two mortuary chapels. One had a stone-lined tomb, and a fragment of life-sized sculptured leg, with chain mail and a stirrup strap from a broken effigy. This may have happened at the dissolution of the abbey in 1538. A highly decorated grave slab and the remains of two skeletons had been unearthed in 1970.

Analysis of the burials shows a large number of elderly people many having suffered from trauma such as leg fractures, fused and/or deformed leg joints and advanced spine degeneration. Many of these may have died in the abbey infirmary and further analysis is being undertaken.

First World War
On 19 October 1917 at 10.45 pm German Zeppelins dropped bombs near Burghley Park then passed over Northampton dropping nine incendiary bombs over Kingsthorpe, Dallington and Far Cotton. Another fell on the roof of 46 Parkwood Street on St. James probably aiming for the Station. The house was occupied by Mr. Henry Gammons, a railway bricklayer, who was away at the time. His wife, Mrs. Eliza Gammons, and twin daughters Gladys and Lily, aged 13, were in bed. The bomb passed through the house to the bedroom, killing the mother instantly and set fire to the room. Both mother and daughters were killed.

Governance
The St James neighbourhood grew up in the parts of the parishes of Dallington and Duston adjacent to the city. In 1895 two new parishes, Dallington St James and Dunston St James, were carved out to cover the built-up areas of the parishes, and together they were administered by the new St James Northampton urban district. This district only survived until 1900, since when St James' End has been administered as part of the town. The parishes survived until 1913.

St James' End is now in the St James Ward of Northampton Borough Council, currently held by the Labour Party. St James End has been part of the Sixfields division of Northamptonshire County Council since the 2013 county council elections, when it was held by the Liberal Democrat party. The division covers the Northampton town areas of Briar Hill, Camp Hill, part of West Hunsbury, Hunsbury Hill, Swan Valley, Hunsbury Meadows, Upton and St James. The population of this ward at the 2011 Census was 5,465.

Notable buildings
St James today is most notable for the presence of the National Lift Tower in Weedon Road, formerly the Express Lift Tower and nicknamed the 'Northampton Lighthouse'. The building is a lift-testing tower built by the Express Lift Company which closed in 1990. The building was officially opened by Queen Elizabeth II on 12 November 1982.

The Parish Church of St James in St James' Road was built in 1868–71 by R. Wheeler of Tonbridge, Kent, with additional work in 1900 and the tower in 1920. The brick is exposed inside and enriched with black bricks.

The Doddridge Centre in St James Road was built in 1895 as the Doddridge Memorial Chapel in memory of Philip Doddridge (1702–1751), an English Nonconformist. It provides facilities and support to community and voluntary groups with 30 groups based in the building and another 40 using it as a meeting point for a variety of activities. The chapel where Doddridge served from 1729–51 is in Doddridge Street on the east side of the river. It dates from 1695 and is now a United Reformed Church. The interior has galleries, box pews and a memorial to Doddridge.

St James is home to the Northampton Saints Rugby Football Club at Franklin's Gardens stadium on the south-west side of lower Weedon Road. The club was established in 1880 under the original title of Northampton St James by Rev Samuel Wathen Wigg, a clergyman and curate of St James' Church. The Sixfields Stadium used by Northampton Town Football Club (known as "The Cobblers") at the top end of Weedon road in the area known as Sixfields currently playing in League Division Two. The Sixfields area also has a large Sainsbury's supermarket, Boots, M&S Simply Food, Wickes, McDonald's, several restaurants, a multi-screen cinema, and several other retail outlets.

The First Northampton bus service operated out of the former Northampton Transport depot on St James's Road but withdrew services on 14 September 2013. The depot remained in operation until 22 October 2013 to service the First Northampton operated Luton Airport Parkway railway station – Luton Airport service. It was then transferred to First Essex's Chelmsford depot. This left the large depot empty. It had been opened in 1904 as the main depot for electric trams and then in the 1920s for motorbuses. Between then and 1939 it was extended considerably, but in 2013 the last service bus left and the depot was made redundant. In 2014 the site was acquired for expansion by Church's Shoes which has a factory next door. As of November 2022 the depot site remains unused and enclosed by Church's-branded hoarding.

Industry

Former works
The Express Lift factory closed in 1990 having been a major employer (see notable buildings). Mettoy had a large site, originally used as a boot factory, at the corner of Spencer Bridge Road and Harlestone Road, NN5 7AE, now occupied by Aldi and Iceland supermarkets.

Current establishments
On St James Road between Sharman Road and Spencer Street is the factory of Church's the up-market footwear manufacturer founded in 1873 by Thomas Church. The company is now owned by Prada. As at November 2022 plans to expand the factory into a part of the redundant bus depot next door remain unrealised. ( The depot site remains enclosed by Church's branded hoarding but untouched since 2014 ). The front entrance to the building has images of a Native American (see gallery). This reflects the previous ownership by the company Padmore and Barnes; they produced footwear using a moccasin construction, and a Native American was their emblem; they produced some 6,000 pairs of moccasins in the first half of the 20th century. A statue stood at the top of the front of the building but was removed when the works closed.

The large and thriving St James Industrial Estate along St James Mill Road near West Bridge is host to a large number of business and industrial establishments including the headquarters of Cosworth Engineering.

There are three public houses in St James: The Thomas Á Becket and the Foundrymans Arms in St James Road and The Sevens in Weedon Road. There is also a working men's club in Weedon Road. A fourth pub, The Castle, in St James Park Road, was converted to rented flats and a shop - marking the end of the building's use as a public house. More recently, Jimmy's Sports Bar opened on the Harlestone Road which includes a rooftop bar.

Traffic issues
Both St James Road and Spencer Bridge Road feed into Weedon Road and are the main exits to the M1 motorway at junction 16. All these roads are busy 24/7 with heavy traffic, fumes and noise from vehicles. A recent report for Northampton Borough Council states:  "Existing conditions within the study area show poor air quality, with concentrations of nitrogen dioxide exceeding the annual mean objective along Weedon Road and St James’ Road near to the development site. An AQMA (Air quality management area) has been declared for this area" .

1998 floods
The part of St James in St James Road and the lower parts of Harlestone Road and Weedon Road are low lying and in the flood plain of the River Nene and its tributaries. In April 1998, many residents of both St James had to leave their homes and seek temporary accommodation elsewhere, after part of the area, along with Far Cotton and Cotton End, suffered flooding, when the River Nene broke its banks after torrential rain. Flooding occurred on Good Friday, 10 April 1998. Since then river banks have been raised and flood mitigation lakes created west of the town (see gallery).

Area maps and views

2014 map
There is no exact de-lineation of the St James area – the red outline on the modern map shown below gives the area generally regarded as St James. This differs from official designations of Borough Council Wards and County Council Divisions which often include additional areas used to even up the numbers of voters. The northern area comprises what are known as the 'Scottish streets' after their street names. On the west side, off Weedon Road, is the Lift Tower estate and several side roads up the hill to Sixfields. In the south is the large and thriving St James Industrial Estate along St James Mill Road. Part of the St James area extends east of the railway into St James retail park with a large B&Q store, Toys R Us, Curry's, PC World, Dunelm, Next and several other outlets plus Kentucky Fried Chicken and Starbucks restaurants.

The eastern part of St James lies just west of a tributary of the River Nene and the railway station and was the first part of the area to be developed for housing and industrial use in the mid and late 19th century as can be seen from the 1899 map. This area extends to Spencer Bridge Road in the north beyond which is the area of the town known as Spencer, after the Spencer family of Althorp, about 5 miles north, however the area includes the houses nearest to Harlestone Road including St James Church of England Primary School. This is the only school in the St James area and has nearly 500 pupils aged 3 to 11. The school was rated 'good' at the last OFSTED inspection.

Part of the area south-west of St James Road appear on the 1899 map such as Abbey Street, Almad Street, Lincoln Road and Spencer Street. Other areas further up Weedon Road have terraced houses on the 1899 map but have been cleared for three blocks of council flats close to Franklin's Gardens stadium.

1899 map
The eastern part of St James was the first area to be developed for housing and industrial use in the mid and late 19th century as this map shows. There are three shoe factories shown, a tannery, saw mills and a cycle works. The railway arrived from London, Euston in 1881 on a loop line from the main line north of the village of Roade, although a connection to Market Harborough and further north was in place earlier. The large goods area at the station reflects the main method of goods transit at the time. What is now Victoria Park is shown on the map as a recreation ground. The park was opened in 1898 on land donated by Earl Spencer of Althorp. At that time it was half the present size. Further land was acquired from the Earl in 1910 and 1911. As of August 2021 it has a children's play area, a changing rooms building used by visiting football teams, static outdoor exercise equipment and a multipurpose enclosed sports pitch ( remodelled from previous tennis courts ). The former bowling green was removed c.2000.

Gallery

See also
List of monastic houses in Northamptonshire
1998 Easter Floods

References

External links 
Far Cotton History Group

Areas of Northampton